John Møller (9 January 1866 – 15 January 1935) was a Norwegian rifle shooter. He was born in Nes, Akershus. He won a silver medal in free rifle team at the 1906 Summer Olympics in Athens, together with Gudbrand Skatteboe, Julius Braathe, Albert Helgerud and Ole Holm.

References

1866 births
1935 deaths
People from Nes, Akershus
People from Akershus
Norwegian male sport shooters
Shooters at the 1906 Intercalated Games
Medalists at the 1906 Intercalated Games
Olympic silver medalists for Norway
Sportspeople from Viken (county)
20th-century Norwegian people